Reactance may refer to:

 Electrical reactance, the opposition to a change in voltage due to capacitance (capacitive reactance) or in current due to inductance (inductive reactance); the imaginary component of AC impedance
 Magnetic reactance, a similar effect in magnetism 
 Reactance (psychology), an emotional reaction to pressure or persuasion that results in the strengthening or adoption of a contrary belief

See also 
 Reactants, chemical reagents
 Reactivity (disambiguation)